Ptyongnathosia oxynosocia is a species of moth of the family Tortricidae. It is endemic to Ecuador (Loja Province).

References

Moths described in 2002
Endemic fauna of Ecuador
Tortricidae of South America
Euliini
Taxa named by Józef Razowski